The symbols of Palestine are official and unofficial flags, icons or cultural expressions that are emblematic, representative or otherwise characteristic of Palestine and of its culture.

Overview
The scope of what is included in the symbols of Palestine includes the state flag and its ensign based on the Flag of the Arab Revolt. It also includes Palestinian vexillology and signs used by the Palestinian National Authority. The fida'i is its national anthem. The Palestine sunbird has been suggested as a possible national bird of Palestine in the future. The Palestinian Authority passport has been described as a 'crucial symbol of nationhood.' Postage stamps and postal history of the Palestinian National Authority also constitute as a national symbol. The list of foundational symbols of Palestinian identity include:
 Al Aqsa (compound), particularly the Dome of the Rock
 Handala
 the Palestinian key
 the Nakba
 the Palestinian keffiyeh

Among the additional objects which are considered to be symbols of the Palestinian nation, is the indigenous Palestinian Poppy. Often red, white, and green (due to stems and leaves), these flowers display the primary colors of the Palestinian flag. Oranges, lemons, olive trees, and the cactus pear are also widely accepted as symbols for the Palestinian nation.

References

Symbols
Palestine national symbols